Pratyangira (Sanskrit: प्रत्यङ्गिरा, Pratyaṅgirā), also called Atharvana Bhadrakali, Narasimhi, Simhamukhi, and Nikumbala, is a Hindu goddess associated with Shaktism. She is described to be the female energy and consort of Narasimha. According to the Tripura Rahasya, she is the pure manifestation of the wrath of Tripura Sundari. In the Vedas, Pratyangira is represented in the form of Atharvana Bhadrakali, the goddess of the Atharva Veda and magical spells. Narasimhi is part of the Saptamatrika mother goddesses.

Legends
There are many Hindu texts that state different legends of Narasimhi. 

In a tale of the Devi Mahatmyam, Narasimhi was one of the Saptamatrika, or one of the seven mother goddesses who assembled to defeat the forces of the asuras Sumbha and Nisumbha, who had overrun Svarga (heaven).   

According to many Puranas, at the end of the Krita Yuga, a glittering spark appeared from the universe and transformed into a wicked demon named Vipulasura. Vipulasura disturbed a group of eight sages who were performing rituals of Ashta Lakshmi. This angered the goddess who transformed a holy lotus flower into a kavacha or a strong shield. It is also mentioned that the lotus that was transformed had 562 petals in it. The shield provided a great protection to the eight sages, allowing them to perform the holy rituals without any disturbance. Following this, the Devi took the form of Narasimhi and defeated the demon Vipulasura.  

According to the Markandeya Purana and Shiva Purana, in the beginning of the Treta Yuga, Narasimha, the fourth among the ten avatars of Vishnu, killed the unruly asura king Hiranyakashipu by ripping his body to shreds. Narasimha grew furious and unstoppable due to the evil contained in Hiranyakashipu's body. While the original story ended with Prahlada pacifying him and convincing him to return to Vaikuntha, in the Shaiva tradition, Shiva assumed the form of Sharabha, a bird-man hybrid. Sharabha tried to carry Narasimha in his talons, but Narasimha in turn assumed the form of Gandabherunda and engulfed Sharbha. Upon the prayers of Shiva, Mahadevi took the form of Pratyangira and emerged out of the head of Sharbha, pacifying Narasimha and taking her place as his consort, Narasimhi. 

In another version, it is mentioned that in ancient times, when two Rishis, Prathiyangira and Angiras were meditating, they re-discovered a Goddess through a Moola Mantra who was nameless. Later, she prized the rishis by naming herself after them, henceforth called Pratyangira Devi.  

The term 'Prati' means reverse and 'Angiras''' means attacking. Thus, the goddess Pratyangira is the one who reverses any black magic attacks. In the temples of South India, She is also eulogised as Atharvana Bhadrakali as the she is considered the embodiment of the Atharva Veda.Teun Goudriaan Maya: Divine And Human

 Association 
In some images she is shown as dark-complexioned, terrible in aspect, having a lion's face with reddened eyes and riding a lion or wearing black garments, she wears a garland of human skulls; her hair stands on end, and she holds a trident, a serpent in the form of a noose, a hand-drum and a skull in her four hands. She is associated with Sharabha and she has a variant form, Atharvana-Bhadra-Kali. She is considered to be a powerful repellent of the influences generated by witchcraft and is said to have the power to punish anyone doing Adharma. It is said that when Narashimhika shakes her Lion's Mane, she throws the stars into disarray.Benoytosh Bhattacharyya THE INDIAN BUDDHIST ICONOGRAPHY

In Hindu Epics

Prathyangira is also mentioned in the Hindu epic Ramayana''. Indrajit was performing "Nikumbala yaga" (a sacred ritual to worship Goddess Nikumbala, which is another name of Goddess Prathyangira) while Rama and his soldiers were waging war in Lanka. Hanuman came down to stop this ritual because he knew that if Indrajit completed it, he would become invincible.

Worship
Tantra classifies deities as Shanta (calm), Ugra (wrathful), Prachanda (horrifying), Ghora (terrifying) and Teevra (ferocious). Pratyangira worship is strictly prohibited for people who have namesake Bhakti. Pratyangira worship is only done by the guidance of a Guru who is proficient in Tantra.

Worships dedicated to Pratyangira is performed at many places for the welfare of the people and for eliminating the influences of evil forces. In some temples Pratyangira Devi Homam (Havan) is performed on days of Amavasya.

Eight kinds of Tantric acts
Like all Tantric deities, she can be invoked for the eight kinds of acts usually performed. They are appealing, growth, increasing, attracting, subduing, dissention repealing and killing. Detailed information is found as to what kind of materials are to be used for the respective aim, and the number of recitations to be performed. It is further said that any act performed invoking this deity, especially the bad ones like killing and subduing, it is impossible to retract it even when the doer wishes.

See also

Narasimha
Lakshmi
Vishnu
Devi
Shakti

References

External links
 http://www.astrologypredict.com/special-category.php?page=Pratyangira%20Devi%20-%20Protect%20us%20from%20all%20Terrible
 http://ekatvam.org/about-ekatvam/sri-maha-pratyangira-devi.html
 Pratyangira Devi In Nanjangud
 Pratyangira Devi In Sholinganallur, Chennai
Maha Pratyangira Devi temple Thiruvallur

Hindu goddesses